Harry Simon (born 21 October 1971) is a Namibian former professional boxer. He is a two-weight world champion, having held the WBO junior middleweight title from 1998 to 2001, and the WBO middleweight title in 2002.

In 2002, Simon was involved in a serious car crash. He was found guilty of "culpable homicide" and sentenced to jail in 2007. Simon was released in 2009. He lost his world middleweight title owing to injuries sustained from the car accident, being stripped of the belt for failure to defend it. 

In 2013 Simon won the vacant IBF International Light Heavyweight title against Geard Ajetović, and defended it against him again in 2014.

Amateur highlights 
As an amateur Simon represented Namibia as a welterweight at the 1992 Summer Olympics in Barcelona, Spain, and had an overall amateur record of 121-9. His result was:
Lost to Aníbal Acevedo (Puerto Rico) 11-13

Professional career 
Simon turned pro in 1994 and won the WBO junior middleweight title in 1998 by defeating Winky Wright by controversial decision. The bout had initially been ruled a draw, but then a "scoring error" favoring Simon was discovered. He defended the title four times against Kevin Lueshing, Enrique Areco, Rodney Jones and Wayne Alexander. He later captured the WBO middleweight title against Sweden's Armand Krajnc in a unanimous 12-round decision. In 2002, Simon was involved in a serious car accident, sustaining injuries that prevented his defending his title; because of this he was stripped of the belt.

Simon returned to boxing in March 2007, winning an eight round decision over Stephen Nzuemb, in Namibia. He won a fight against Tanzanian Rashid Mutumla by knockout on 2 December 2010. Following his release from jail in 2009, Simon launched a comeback, recording several wins over journeyman opposition. 

On 24 November 2018 Simon fought together with his son, Harry Simon Jr. They both won their fights, making it a first in Namibia for father and son to appear together, and to both win.

Outside the ring 
Simon was involved in two serious car accidents resulting in fatalities. In the first accident in 2001, two people died outside Swakopmund in a hit-and-run accident. Some controversy developed around this accident, as blood samples disappeared, and originally Simon was reported to be driving. His driver later admitted to have steered the vehicle and was sentenced to 2 years in jail.

The second accident, in late 2002, saw Simon seriously injured and eventually sent to jail. Three Belgian tourists - two adults and a baby - died in the collision with Simon's Mercedes-Benz at Langstrand in November 2002. On 5 August 2005, Simon was given a two-year jail sentence, after he was found guilty of culpable homicide stemming from the November 2002 car accident, which resulted in the deaths of the three people.

On 9 July 2007, Simon began serving his two-year prison sentence for culpable homicide after losing the appeal of his 2005 conviction. Simon did not call any witnesses or testify in his own behalf during the appeal proceedings, and his conviction and sentence were not overturned. He was released in 2009. In 2020 he published a book, "Lifestyle and Treatments in Prison", detailing his experiences in jail.

Professional boxing record

References

External links 
 

|-

|-

1971 births
Living people
Sportspeople from Walvis Bay
Ovambo people
Olympic boxers of Namibia
Boxers at the 1992 Summer Olympics
World Boxing Organization champions
Light-middleweight boxers
Middleweight boxers
Welterweight boxers
World Boxing Association champions
Namibian male boxers
African Games gold medalists for Namibia
African Games medalists in boxing
Undefeated world boxing champions
Competitors at the 1991 All-Africa Games